Gaurav Sharma may refer to:

 Gaurav Sharma (author) (born 1992), Indian-born Canadian author
 Gaurav Sharma (engineer), American engineer
 Gaurav Sharma (politician) (born 1987), New Zealand doctor and former politician
 Gaurav Sharma (singer) (born 1992), Indian singer and composer